Rafał Czuper (born 19 February 1988) is a Polish para table tennis player. He competed at the 2016 Summer Paralympics, winning a silver medal. He competed at the 2020 Summer Paralympics, winning a silver and bronze medal.

He competed at the 2013 European championship.

References

External links 

 Rafal Czuper Archives – International Table Tennis Federation (ittf.com)
 Po medal! Rafał Czuper! Słowenia 2018! – Oct 18, 2018

1988 births
Living people
Paralympic table tennis players of Poland
Medalists at the 2016 Summer Paralympics
Table tennis players at the 2016 Summer Paralympics
Paralympic medalists in table tennis
Paralympic silver medalists for Poland
Table tennis players at the 2020 Summer Paralympics
Polish male table tennis players
20th-century Polish people
21st-century Polish people